Sunset Express is a 1996 detective novel by Robert Crais. It is the sixth in a series of linked novels centering on the private investigator Elvis Cole.   It won the Shamus Award and was named as one of the "Best Books of 1996" by Publishers Weekly.

Novels by Robert Crais
1996 American novels